Estelle Erika Ainee Alphand (born 23 April 1995) is a French-born Swedish alpine skier, who competes in all events. She was born in Briançon, France, and she is the daughter of the former alpine skier and rally driver Luc Alphand. She has represented Sweden since the start of the 2018 season, having previously competed for France.

Biography
Alphand, whose mother Anna-Karin is Swedish, took part in her first FIS races aged 15. In January 2011 she won her first competition on this level: an alpine combined in Tignes. One month later, she for the first time competed at the World Junior Championships. In February 2011 she entered the European Cup. Her first season concluded with Alphand becoming French junior champion in slalom. At the first Youth Winter Olympic Games in February 2012 in Innsbruck, Alphand won three medals: gold in super-G, and silver in both giant slalom and super combined.

During the following two winters, Alphand mostly competed in the European cup, where she in December 2012 premiered on the podium after a super combined in Kvitfjell. Her first appearance in the World Cup was in a giant slalom in Ofterschwang in March 2013. Her best result in the World Junior Championships was when she finished in 4th place in the downhill in Lillehammer in 2015. Alphand won her first World Cup points on 24 November 2015, finishing 21st in a giant slalom in Aspen.

During the 2016–2017 season Alphand reached World Cup points only once, after which she fell out of the French national team. She then asked the French federation to allow her to compete for Sweden instead. After short negotiations she left France and is from the 2018 season a member of the Swedish team. Changing teams proved to be a correct decision and Alphand soon advanced to starting positions at top-30 in both slalom and giant slalom. On 28 December 2017 she was 5th in the World Cup slalom of Lienz, and thereby reached her best World Cup finish.

When representing Sweden at the FIS Alpine World Ski Championships 2021, she was part of the Swedish team that earned a silver medal in the combined men's and women's team competition.

Season standings

World Championship results

Olympic results

References

External links

1995 births
Swedish female alpine skiers
French female alpine skiers
Alpine skiers at the 2018 Winter Olympics
Olympic alpine skiers of Sweden
Swedish people of French descent
People from Briançon
Living people
Sportspeople from Hautes-Alpes
Youth Olympic gold medalists for France
Alpine skiers at the 2012 Winter Youth Olympics